Anne L. Nathan is an American actress and singer.

Career
Anne L. Nathan made her Broadway debut in 1998 as Brigit in Ragtime. Other Broadway credits include: It Shoulda Been You as Aunt Sheila/Mimsy, Baruska in the Broadway musical Once, The Roundabout Theater Company’s revival of Sunday in the Park with George playing Nurse, Mrs. and Harriet, Matron “Mama” Morton in Chicago, Emma Goldman in Assassins, Thoroughly Modern Millie (Miss Flannery) and Ragtime. 

Off-Broadway: Singstreet at NYTW, Joe Iconis’s Broadway Bounty Hunter, Sun Down Yellow Moon (Ars Nova /Woman’s Project) Taming of the Shrew at The Delacorte (The Public Theater) Wings at 2ST; Marthe in the Encores! production of Music in the Air; Aunt Eva in Stephen Sondheim’s Road Show at The Public Theater; and Swingtime Canteen. 

She has toured with the national companies of Chicago (Carbonell Award), Les Misérables and Aspects of Love. 

Nathan’s regional credits include Mrs. Fezziwig in The McCarter Theater’s A Christmas Carol, Lucienne in A Flea In Her Ear,  at the Kansas City Repertory Theatre, She has played Charlotte in Falsettos at both George Street Playhouse and The Huntington Theatre Company. Other regional credits include productions at La Jolla Playhouse, Barrington Stage Company and The Asolo Theatre Recordings: Sing Street, It Shoulda Been You Once, Ragtime, Thoroughly Modern Millie, Assassins, Road Show, Out Of Context- The Songs of Michael Patrick Walker.

Nathan’s film and television credits include You Must Be Joking, Baby Mama, King of California, Little America, Elementary, The Good Wife, Dirt, Law & Order (Trial by Jury, Special Victims Unit, and Criminal Intent), Veronica Mars, What I Like About You, and Bull.  She has also been on Three Tony Award telecasts, Letterman, America’s Got Talent, The Today Show, and The Rosie O’Donnell Show. Nathan can be seen on the web series Submissions Only. (submissionsonly.com)

Theatre credits
Source: Playbill

Filmography
Source: Internet Movie Database

Film

Television

Coaching
Nathan also works as an acting and singing coach.

References

http://www.annelnathan.com/files/AnneLNathanResume.pdf

External links

Year of birth missing (living people)
American film actresses
American stage actresses
Living people
American web series actresses
20th-century American actresses
21st-century American actresses